Devarajah (English: Divine King or God King) is an ancient and uncommon surname of Indo-European origin. See Sacred Kingship

History
Dēva derives from the Proto-Indo-European (PIE) word, *deiwos, originally an adjective meaning "celestial" or "shining", which is a PIE (not synchronic Sanskrit) vrddhi derivative from the root *diw meaning "to shine", especially as the day-lit sky(words such as the English "Day", Spanish "Día", Sanksirt "Div/Dina", Lithuanian "Diena" stem from *diw - literally the day-lit sky). 
Zeus, Týr, Jupiter, Dyauṣ Pitār and the names of various other Indo-European gods are closely linked derivatives of the PIE *deiwos, specifically from Dyeus and its derivatives: dyāus in Sanskrit, deus in Latin and zeus in Ancient Greek.

Rajah is an aristocratic title derived from the Sanskrit rājān- which is cognate to Latin rēx (genitive rēgis), Gaulish rīx etc., originally denoting tribal chiefs or heads of small 'city states'. It is ultimately derived from a PIE *h3rẽǵs, a vrddhi formation to the root *h3reǵ- "to straighten, to order, to rule". The Sanskrit n-stem is secondary in the male title, apparently adapted from the female counterpart rājñī which also has an -n- suffix in related languages, compare Old Irish rígain and Latin regina.

Hindu surnames